Khmer Airlines was an airline based in Cambodia.

History

As Khmer Akas
Khmer Akas was founded in 1970, it operated Convair 440 and more, the airline ceased in 1973 to be rebranded as Khmer Airlines.

As Khmer Airlines
Khmer Airlines was founded in 1973 after Khmer Akas ceased operations, it operated Britten-Norman BN-2 aircraft and Douglas DC-3 piston airliner, the airline ceased in 1975 after the fall of the Khmer Rouge

Destinations

Fleet
Before it ceased operations in 1975, Khmer Airlines operated:

Accidents and Incidents
On 8 October 1974, a Douglas DC-3 attempted to take off with out flaps, while aircraft was overrunning the runway, it hit 4 buffaloes killing them and the one of the propellers separated from the aircraft.
On 1975 (day and month unknown), a Britten Norman BN-2 Islander was destroyed on the ground

References

Defunct airlines of Cambodia
Airlines established in 1973
Airlines disestablished in 1975